Marovoay is a district in northwestern Madagascar. It is a part of Boeny Region and borders the districts of Mahajanga II in north, Boriziny and Mampikony in east, Ambato-Boeni in south and Mitsinjo in west.

Communes
The district is further divided into 12 communes:

 Ambolomoty
 Ankaraobato
 Ankazomborona
 Anosinalainolona
 Antanambao Andranolava
 Antanimasaka
 Bemaharivo
 Manaratsandry
 Marosakoa
 Marovoay
 Marovoay Banlieue
 Tsararano

Rivers
The Betsiboka River.

References and notes

Districts of Boeny